Cao Yupeng (born 27 October 1990) is a Chinese professional snooker player. He won the 2011 Asian Under-21 Championship, thus qualifying for the professional main tour for the 2011–12 season. In his first season on the circuit, he reached the last 16 of the World Championship.

He served a ban for match-fixing from 25 May 2018 until 24 November 2020. He received the ban on 1 December 2018, after pleading guilty to manipulating the outcome of matches.

Career

Early career
Cao was selected as a wild card for the China Open twice, losing to Stuart Pettman in 2009 and Kurt Maflin in 2011. In April 2011, he beat Hossein Vafaei 7–3 in the final of the Asian Under-21 Championship, and in doing so earned a place on the main professional snooker tour for the 2011–12 season.

First season as a professional
Cao qualified for the 2012 World Snooker Championship in his debut season after defeating Kurt Maflin 10–2, Dave Harold 10–9 (coming back from 6–9 down), Nigel Bond 10–7 and Tom Ford 10–9 in the qualifying rounds. At the venue stage he put in an outstanding performance beating Mark Allen (world number 11) 10–6 to reach the last 16. After the match, Allen accused Cao of dishonesty following what he perceived as a foul shot which Cao did not own up to when he was leading 5–4. Allen also said that "blatant cheating" might be "a bit of a trait for the Chinese players". Television replays of the incident proved inconclusive with Cao stating that he did not remember the shot as he was focusing on the game. Allen later apologised for his remarks, admitting that he had "overstepped the line". Cao played Ryan Day in his next match and trailed 7–9 going into the final session, when his opponent won four straight frames in just over an hour to result in a 7–13 defeat. Cao finished the season ranked world number 70, outside of the top 64 who retain their places on the snooker tour.
However, he was awarded the second nomination from the Chinese national governing body for a spot in the 2012–13 season.

2012/2013 season
Cao qualified for the second ranking event of the season, the Australian Goldfields Open, by beating Paul Davison, Alfie Burden and Mike Dunn all by 5–2 scorelines. He received a bye in the final qualifying round due to Anthony Hamilton's withdrawal, and then came through a wild-card match against Johl Younger once in Australia to reach the last 32. He faced Ali Carter and raced into a 4–0 lead, before withstanding a fightback, eventually going on to win 5–3. Cao was beaten 5–4 by Martin Gould in the second round, without there ever being more than a frame between the players. He made a 143 break in the sixth frame, the highest of his career to date. A month later, Cao won three qualifying matches to reach the International Championship, played in Chengdu, in his homeland. He saw off Wang Yuchen in the wild-card round, before beating four-time world champion John Higgins in the first round, to set up a rematch with Mark Allen, following their clash at the end of last season. It was Allen who triumphed this time, with a 6–2 win.

He also came through three matches to qualify for the UK Championship for the first time. He was beaten 5–1 by Mark Davis in the first round in York. Cao could only win one more match during the rest of the season, culminating in the second round of World Championship Qualifying where he lost 10–7 to Zhang Anda, meaning he was unable to repeat last year's run to The Crucible. He was ranked world number 66 in the end of season rankings.

2013/2014 season
Cao reached the first quarter-final of his career at the 2013 Wuxi Classic, the opening ranking event of the 2013–14 season. He qualified by defeating Paul Davison 5–1 and then saw off Michael White 5–3, world number eight Barry Hawkins 5–4 and Ben Woollaston 5–3. He faced world number one, Neil Robertson and, although he led 4–3 and made five breaks above 50 in five separate frames during the match, he was edged out 5–4. This was the closest match Robertson had and he ultimately went on to win the title.
Cao won the first title of his career in winning the gold medal in the men's singles at the Asian Indoor and Martial Arts Games by beating Ding Junhui 4–2 in the final. Cao qualified for four more ranking events during the season but lost in the first round in each one, coming closest to progressing at the International Championship when he came back from 5–2 down against Ding to level before losing the final frame. All 128 players on the snooker tour earned automatic entry into the first round of the Welsh Open with Cao seeing off David Grace 4–2, but then lost another deciding frame in the next round this time against world number five, Hawkins. Cao's world ranking went up 20 places during the season as finished it as the number 46.

2014/2015 season
He came close to reaching the quarter-finals of the Wuxi Classic for the second season in a row, after he defeated Mark King 5–1 and Ricky Walden 5–3, stating that he done some body building, jogging and gym work to try to improve his game. He lost 5–1 to Robin Hull in the last 16. He was knocked out in the first round of the UK Championship 6–4 by Lyu Haotian and beat Craig Steadman 4–2 at the Welsh Open. He won two frames to force a decider in the second round against Mark Allen which Cao lost. Cao also qualified for the Indian Open and China Open, but was eliminated in the first round of both. He dropped 14 places in the world rankings to 60th, but inside the top 64 who remain on tour.

2015/2016 season
Cao qualified for the International Championship with a 6–2 win over Liam Highfield, but was beaten 6–2 by Tian Pengfei in the first round. He could only win a total of four matches all season to finish 72nd in the world rankings. This meant that Cao had to enter Q School and he earned his place back on the tour at the first event with five match wins.

2016/2017 season
Cao was on a losing streak of 11 matches until he played in the Shoot-Out where he knocked out three players, before being defeated by David Grace. Aside from that he only won two matches during the season.

2017/2018 season 
Cao notched his first-ever maximum break in tournament play in the second round of the Scottish Open. He became only the third player from mainland China to achieve the feat, following Ding Junhui and Liang Wenbo. Cao later reached the final of the Scottish Open, the first ranking final in his career. After leading 8–4, his opponent, Neil Robertson, won the final five frames in dramatic fashion to defeat Cao by 9–8. The same season he reached the semi-finals of the European Masters but lost to eventual champion Judd Trump and his second final the Gibraltar Open, where he lost 4–0 to Ryan Day.

On 25 May 2018 he was suspended from the tour, alongside Yu Delu and David John, pending an investigation into suspected match fixing. After admitting to fixing three matches in 2016, Cao was suspended from professional play for thirty months by the WPBSA.

2020/2021 season 
Cao's ban expired in November 2020, but he was unable to play in the professional circuit as a top-up so entered into the CBSA China Tour. He regained his professional tour card having defeated Liu Hingyu 4–3 in the CBSA China Tours' second qualifying event, alongside former professional Zhang Anda.

2021/2022 season 
Despite having been suspended from the World Snooker Tour for three years, Cao had a relatively good start to his campaign in the 2021 Championship League and the 2021 British Open, with good performances in his matches throughout the season as a whole. Although he did not progress past the third round of any tournament, except the 2021 UK Championship, he had reached the cusp of the Top 64 by the 2022 World Snooker Championship, being seeded 70th in the qualifying round.

Personal life
Cao is based in Gloucester, England, during the snooker season.

Performance and rankings timeline

Career finals

Ranking finals: 2

Non-ranking finals: 2 (1 title)

Pro-am finals: 2 (2 titles)

Amateur finals: 1 (1 title)

References

External links

1990 births
Living people
Chinese snooker players
Sportspeople from Guangzhou
Match fixers
Banned sportspeople